In French grammar, que/qui alternation, or masquerade, is a syntactic phenomenon whereby the complementizer que is used to introduce subordinate clauses which contain a grammatical subject, while the form qui is used where the subject position is vacant.

References

French grammar
Syntactic transformation